Mount Royal Avenue (officially in ), once named Tannery Road, is a street in Montreal, Quebec, Canada. The main part of the street transects the borough of Le Plateau-Mont-Royal, from Park Avenue at the foot of Mount Royal, for which the road is named, to Frontenac St. Another section in Rosemont–La Petite-Patrie runs from Molson St. to Pie-IX Boulevard. West of Park Avenue, the road continues into Outremont (where it becomes Mount Royal Boulevard), skirting the northern rim of the mountain to a terminus at Vincent d'Indy Avenue near the Édouard-Montpetit metro station.

The western section of the avenue is the principal artery of the Plateau, forming the southern border of the Mile End neighbourhood. Notable businesses on the street include the restaurants La Binerie Mont-Royal and Beauty's.
The Mont-Royal metro station is located at the corner of Mount Royal Ave. and Rivard St., at Place Gérald-Godin.

References

External links
 La Société de Développement de l'Avenue du Mont-Royal (SDAMR)

Streets in Montreal